The 63rd Filmfare Awards ceremony, presented by the Filmfare Magazine, honored the best Hindi language Indian films of 2017. The ceremony was held on 20 January 2018 and hosted by Shah Rukh Khan, Karan Johar, Ayushmann Khurrana and Parineeti Chopra.

Jagga Jasoos and Secret Superstar led the ceremony with 10 nominations each, followed by Tumhari Sulu with 9 nominations.

Jagga Jasoos won 4 awards, including Best Music Director (for Pritam) and Best Lyricist (for Amitabh Bhattacharya for "Ullu Ka Pattha"), thus becoming the most-awarded film at the ceremony.

Seema Pahwa received dual nominations for Best Supporting Actress for her performances in Bareilly Ki Barfi and Shubh Mangal Saavdhan, but lost to Meher Vij who won the award for Secret Superstar.

Winners and nominees

Main awards

Nominees were announced on 18 January 2018. Winners were announced on 20 January 2018.

Critics' awards
Nominations for the critics award was announced on 19 January 2018.

Special awards

Technical Awards

Multiple nominations

Multiple awards

See also
 Filmfare Awards

References

http://www.thehansindia.com/posts/index/Cinema/2018-06-17/65th-Jio-Filmfare-Awards-South-2018-Complete-Winners-List/389918

External links
 Filmfare Official Website
 Filmfare Awards 2018

Filmfare Awards
2018 Indian film awards